Idaho v. Coeur d'Alene Tribe of Idaho, 521 U.S. 261 (1997), was a United States Supreme Court case in which the Court held that the Coeur d'Alene Tribe could not maintain an action against the state of Idaho to press its claim to Lake Coeur d'Alene due to the state's Eleventh Amendment immunity from suit, notwithstanding the exception recognized in Ex parte Young. The case was an important precedent for aboriginal title in the United States and sovereign immunity in the United States.

After the district court's decision dismissing the suit, the federal government—in its guardian capacity—brought a substantially similar suit against Idaho; in 2001, in another 5–4 decision, the Court ruled for the federal government: Idaho v. United States (2001).

Notes

References 
Pamela D. Bucy, This Land is Our Land, or Coeur D'alene Tribe of Idaho v. State of Idaho, 19 Pub. Land & Resources 113 (1998).
David W. Gross, Examining Aboriginal Rights in Submerged Lands: Coeur D'Alene Tribe v. Idaho, 30 Idaho L. Rev. 139 (1993).
E. Richard Hart, The Continuing Saga of Indian Land Claims: The Coeur D'Alene Tribe's Claim to Lake Coeur D'Alene, 24 Am. Indian Culture & Res. J. 183 (2000).
Lydia Hawkins, An Old Doctrine Assaulted: Kennedy Attempts to Eviscerate Ex parte Young: Idaho v. Coeur d'Alene Tribe of Idaho, 117 S. Ct. 2028 (1997), 24 Ohio N.U. L. Rev. 369 (1998).
John P. LaVelle, Sanctioning a Tyranny: The Diminishment of Ex parte Young, Expansion of Hans Immunity, and Denial of Indian Rights in Coeur d'Alene Tribe, 31 Ariz. St. L.J. 786 (1999).
Randy L. Meyer, The Supreme Court's Analysis in Idaho v. Coeur D'Alene Tribe of Idaho – Is the Young Exception to the Eleventh Amendment Inapplicable to Indian Tribe Claims?, 30 U. Tol. L. Rev. 131 (1998).
James R. Rasband, Was Lake Coeur d'Alene Ever Really In Idaho?  Did Congress Reserve the Lake for the Coeur d'Alene Tribe Prior to Statehood?, 2001 U.S. Sup. Ct. Cas. 380.
Lauren E. Rosenblatt, Removing the Eleventh Amendment Barrier: Defending Indian Land Title against State Encroachment after Idaho v. Coeur d' Alene Tribe, 78 Tex. L. Rev. 719 (1999). 
Kathleen Smith, Land Rights: Quiet Title Action against the State: Idaho v. Coeur d'Alene Tribe of Idaho, No. 94-1474, 1997 Wl 338603 (U.S. June 23, 1997), 22 Am. Indian L. Rev. 249 (1997).
Michael R. Thorp  & Kristen Bamford Wynne, The Coeur d'Alene Case: Breathing New Life into Old Defenses, 17 Nat. Resources & Env't. 194 (2003).
Carlos Manuel Vazquez, Night and Day: Coeur d'Alene, Breard, and the Unraveling of the Prospective-Retrospective Distinction in Eleventh Amendment Doctrine, 87 Geo. L.J. 1 (1998).
Eric B. Wolff, Coeur d'Alene and Existential Categories for Sovereign Immunity Cases, 86 Cal. L. Rev. 879 (1998).

United States Supreme Court cases
Aboriginal title case law in the United States
United States Eleventh Amendment case law
Coeur d'Alene tribe
Legal history of Idaho
United States Supreme Court cases of the Rehnquist Court
1997 in United States case law
Native American history of Idaho